The Center of Political and Foreign Affairs (abb: CPFA) is a think tank focused on government policies and geopolitics, organizes events and discussions on various geopolitical topics around the world

CPFA has organized numerous events under Chatham House rules and has hosted over a hundred personalities such as: Zbigniew Bzrezinski, Kofi Annan, Henry Kissinger, Al Gore, Abdullah Gul, Jose Maria Aznar , Sebastián Piñera, Romano Prodi, Brent Scowcroft, Richard Holbrooke, Shimon Peres, Mohammed ElBaradei, Louis Freeh, Turki Al Faisal since 2007. CPFA has also initiated with the collaboration of Randa Kassis the President of the Astana Platform for peace talks in Syria as well as many other confidential talks on the topics on Syria and Libya.

Initiatives

Peace in Syria Initiative 
In 2015 CPFA appealed to the President of Kazakhstan, Nursultan Nazarbayev to launch a peaceful solution to the Syrian crisis and launched a political platform that could assemble moderate Syrian opponents.

The first round of negotiations in Astana was held from 25 to 27 May and chaired by the Kazakh Foreign Minister Erlan Idrissov. The second round of negotiations in Astana from 2 to 4 October 2015 headed by the Secretary of State of Kazakhstan Gulshara Abdykalikova and mediated by Fabien Baussart and the Kazakh Deputy Foreign Minister Askar Mussinov. The meetings resulted in two resolutions being signed by the participants, which created the Astana Platform and helped pave the way for the Astana process with an agreement between Iran, Russia, and Turkey.

In February and July 2017, the CPFA initiated discussions in Geneva with Randa Kassis to develop a preparatory document to reform the Syrian Constitution. This initiative was promoted during the Syrian National Dialogue Congress in Sochi in January 2018 by Randa Kassis despite objections from the Syrian government and part of the opposition.

Peace talks – Kazakhstan 
In 2015, CPFA launched a "Committee of Wise" that would address various issues related to international peace.

The committee gathered several prominent political figures and Nobel Peace Prize laureates, including former Israeli President Shimon Peres, former Vice President of Egypt and the general-director of the International Atomic Energy Agency Mohamed ElBaradei, former President of Poland Lech Walesa, Guatemalan human rights activist Rigoberta Menchu and the Chairman of the IPCC Rajendra Pachauri, former President of Colombia Cesar Gaviria and former Spanish Prime Minister Jose Luis Zapatero. The Committee met in Nur Sultan, Kazakhstan, where they were received by the President Nazarbayev in the Presidential Palace.

Nuclear Non – Proliferation Initiative 

In 2016, the CPFA organised a conference on nuclear non-proliferation chaired by former UN Secretary-General Kofi Annan in the presence of Bronislaw Komorowski, Jack Straw, Yasar Yakis and Giulio Terzi.

References  

Political organizations based in France
2007 establishments in France
Think tanks
Political union